The swee waxbill (Coccopygia melanotis), is a common species of estrildid finch native to Southern Africa.

Description and subspecies 

The swee waxbill is 9–10 cm long with a grey head and breast, pale yellow belly, olive back and wings, red lower back and rump, and a black tail. The upper mandible is black and the lower red. The male has a black face, but the female's  face is grey. Juveniles are much duller than the female and have an all-black bill.

Habitat and behaviour

The swee waxbill is typically found in uplands in dry shrubland and open forest habitats. Some subspecies also occur in lowlands, and may be seen in large gardens.

This species is a common and tame bird typically seen in small parties, and does not form large flocks. The swee waxbill's call is typically considered a soft swee, swee.

Origin
Origin and phylogeny has been obtained by Antonio Arnaiz-Villena et al. Estrildinae may have originated in India and dispersed thereafter (towards Africa and Pacific Ocean habitats).

References

 BirdLife Species Factsheet
 Clement, Harris and Davis, Finches and Sparrows

External links
Species text in The Atlas of Southern African Birds

swee waxbill
Birds of Southern Africa
swee waxbill